The AEW Women's World Championship is a women's professional wrestling world championship created and promoted by the American promotion All Elite Wrestling (AEW). Established on June 18, 2019, the inaugural champion was Riho. The current champion is Jamie Hayter, who is in her first reign.

History

On June 18, 2019, six months after the American professional wrestling promotion All Elite Wrestling (AEW) was founded, AEW President and Chief Executive Officer Tony Khan announced plans for both a singles and tag team championship for the women's division. It was then announced by AEW Chief Brand Officer Brandi Rhodes that the AEW Women's World Championship belt would be unveiled on August 31 at All Out, and that the first champion would be crowned on October 2 during the inaugural broadcast of AEW's weekly television show, later revealed as Dynamite.

Both participants for the inaugural championship match were determined at All Out. The first competitor was determined by the women's Casino Battle Royale during the Buy In pre-show, which was won by Nyla Rose. Later that night on the main show, Riho became her opponent by defeating Hikaru Shida. On the premiere episode of Dynamite, Riho defeated Rose to become the inaugural champion.

At All Out on September 4, 2022, reigning champion Thunder Rosa was originally scheduled to defend the championship against Toni Storm; however, due to Rosa suffering a back injury in late August, the match was called off. Instead of vacating the title, it was decided that an interim champion would be crowned until Rosa's return, after which, the interim champion would face Rosa to determine the undisputed champion. A four-way match was scheduled for All Out where Storm defeated Dr. Britt Baker, D.M.D., Jamie Hayter, and Hikaru Shida to become the interim champion. At Full Gear on November 19, Hayter defeated Storm to win the interim championship. However, on the November 23 episode of Dynamite, it was announced that Rosa had relinquished the lineal championship, thus Hayter became the undisputed champion by default and Storm's interim reign was retroactively made an official reign.

Belt design

The original AEW Women's World Championship belt had a small oval shaped center plate. There were a total of six side plates, three on each side of the center plate. The top of the center plate had a crown and ornamentation lined the edge of the center plate. At the very center of the plate was a name plate to display the reigning champion's name. Above the name plate was AEW's logo while below the name plate read "Women's World Wrestling Champion". The side plates had a globe at the center with ornamentation around the globe.

On the May 28, 2021, Friday night special airing of Dynamite, reigning champion Hikaru Shida was awarded with a slightly updated championship belt. The updated belt featured the overall same design, but was slightly bigger with extra encrusted diamonds and extra gold plating, and it only had two side plates on each side of the center plate instead of three. The unveiling of this updated design was to commemorate Shida's reign of 370 days, which at the time was the longest reign for any AEW championship (this record would be broken by Jade Cargill with the AEW TBS Championship in January 2023). Shida, however, would lose the title just two days later at Double or Nothing to Dr. Britt Baker, D.M.D.

At Revolution on March 6, 2022, Baker unveiled a new design of the championship belt with bigger plates, similar to the men's AEW World Championship. The new belt was designed by Belts By Dan, which took three weeks to complete, and it was inspired by the Mid-South North American Championship belt of the 1980s.

Reigns

Riho was the inaugural champion. Hikaru Shida's reign is the longest reign at 372 days, while Toni Storm has the shortest reign at 76 days. Riho was the youngest champion at 22 years old while Nyla Rose  is the oldest champion at 37.

Jamie Hayter is the current champion in her first reign. She initially won the interim AEW Women's World Championship by defeating Toni Storm at Full Gear on November 19, 2022, in Newark, NJ. She was later declared the undisputed lineal champion on the November 23 episode of Dynamite after Thunder Rosa relinquished the lineal championship, which also retroactively made Storm's interim reign an official reign.

References

External links
 Official AEW Women's World Championship Title History

2019 introductions
All Elite Wrestling championships
Women's professional wrestling championships
World professional wrestling championships